Dunav Zone League (Serbian: Зонска лига Дунав / Zonska liga Dunav) was one of the Serbian Zone League divisions, the fourth tier of the Serbian football league system. It was run by the Football Association of West Serbia.

Founded in 2007, the league folded in 2018, together with the Drina Zone League and Morava Zone League. Four new sections were established instead, namely Kolubara-Mačva Zone League, Podunavlje-Šumadija Zone League, Šumadija-Raška Zone League and West Morava Zone League.

Seasons

External links
 Football Association of Serbia
 Football Association of West Serbia

Serbian Zone League